Barracas is a Spanish town located in Castellón.

In 2004 a truck carrying 25 tonnes of ammonium nitrate fertilizer exploded half an hour after a traffic accident on March 9, 2004, killing two people and injuring five others. The explosion, which could be heard at a distance of several kilometers caused a crater five metres deep.

References

Municipalities in the Province of Castellón